The Matra R.530 is a French medium to short range air-to-air missile.
It was available in infrared homing and semi active radar homing as the main armament of the Mirage III which was able to carry a single missile in the centerline, the Mirage F1, which carried two under the wings, and the F-8 Crusader, also carrying two on the sides of the fuselage in French Navy service.

Operational history
The Israeli Heyl Ha'Avir (IDF/AF) purchased 15 semi-active radar-homing R.530 missiles from France, along with three training rounds and eight launch pylons, to go with the new Mirage IIICJ "Shahak". It was intended to complement the domestic Rafael Shafrir infrared-homing air-to-air missile.  The missile was christened "Yahalom" (Hebrew for "diamond") in Israeli service and was issued to the No. 110 and No. 117 squadrons for their quick reaction alert (QRA) aircraft. Both squadrons achieved weapons qualification in 1964.

On 29 November 1966, an Israeli Air Force Dassault Mirage III shot down two Egyptian MiG-19s which were trying to intercept an Israeli reconnaissance Piper J-3 Cub in Israeli airspace. The first MiG was destroyed with an R.530 fired from less than a mile away, marking the first aerial kill for the missile. The second MiG-19 was destroyed with cannon fire.

During the Six-Day War, the R.530, as was common for early air-to-air missiles in the 1960s, proved to be chronically unreliable and difficult to use, especially in the close-range dogfights that characterized aerial combat in the war. The R.530 required a radar lock from the Cyrano radar of the Mirage III in order to be launched, but the Cyrano radar was severely hampered by ground clutter at low altitude, where most air combat took place during the Six-Day War, rendering the R.530 nearly useless. The weapon failed to achieve any kills during the Six-Day War.

Gallery

Former operators

See also 
Related development:
 Super 530
Similar weapons
 AIM-4 Falcon
 AIM-26 Falcon
 AIM-7 Sparrow (initial variants)
 K-8 (missile)

References
Citations

Bibliography
 

R.530
R.530
Military equipment introduced in the 1960s